North Nazimabad railway station (Sindhi: اتر ناظم آباد ريلوي اسٽيشن) is located in Karachi, Pakistan, and serves the North Nazimabad suburb.

See also
 List of railway stations in Pakistan
 Pakistan Railways

References

External links

Railway stations in Karachi
Railway stations on Karachi Circular Railway
North Nazimabad Town